Kayla Haneline (born July 4, 1994 Plattsmouth, Nebraska) is an American volleyball player.

Career 
From 2012 to 2016, she attended the University of Northern Iowa and played on the varsity Panthers. She joined the Hungarian club Vasas Óbuda Budapest in 2017 . After that she went to Finland where she played for LP Kangasala in the 2018/19 season.  She then moved within the league to LP Viesti Salo .  

In 2020 she moved to the German Bundesliga club Rote Raben Vilsbiburg; she moved to VfB Suhl Lotto Thuringia for the 2021/22 season; and she signed  with Dresdner SC for the 2022–23 season .

References 

Living people
1994 births
American volleyball players